Jonathan Simba Bwanga (born 8 December 2000) is a Congolese footballer who plays as a centre-back for Ekstraklasa side Radomiak Radom.

Club career
Jonathan Simba Bwanga began his career in his native Democratic Republic of the Congo, before joining Polish side Weszło Warsaw in 2021. On 28 July 2021, he signed with Radomiak Radom. Shortly after, he was loaned to Stomil Olsztyn.

On 14 August 2021, he made his I liga debut in a 0–1 defeat against Arka Gdynia. In his fourth match, played on 13 September 2021, he scored his maiden I liga in a 4–2 win against Resovia. On 20 May 2022, two days before the final matchday, he was recalled from his loan by Radomiak.

References

External links
 

Living people
2000 births
21st-century Democratic Republic of the Congo people
Association football defenders
Democratic Republic of the Congo footballers
Footballers from Kinshasa
I liga players
KTS Weszło Warsaw players
Radomiak Radom players
OKS Stomil Olsztyn players
Expatriate footballers in Poland
Democratic Republic of the Congo expatriate footballers
Democratic Republic of the Congo expatriate sportspeople in Poland